The 2020–21 Boise State Broncos men's basketball team represented Boise State University during the 2020–21 NCAA Division I men's basketball season. The Broncos, led by 11th-year head coach Leon Rice, played their home games at ExtraMile Arena as members of the Mountain West Conference. They finished the season 19-9, 14-6 to finish in 4th place. They lost in the quarterfinals of the Mountain West tournament to Nevada. They received an invitation to the NIT where they defeated SMU in the first round before losing in the quarterfinals to Memphis.

Previous season
The Broncos 20–12, 11–7 in Mountain West play to finish in a tie for fifth place. They defeated UNLV in the quarterfinals of the Mountain West tournament before losing in the semifinals to San Diego State.

Roster

Schedule and results

|- 
!colspan=9 style=| Regular season

|-
!colspan=9 style=| Mountain West tournament

|-
!colspan=9 style=| NIT

References

Boise State Broncos men's basketball seasons
Boise State
Boise
Boise State